Balance is the debut album by Canadian rap group Swollen Members. It was released on the Battleaxe Records label. It has sold 41,000 copies since its release. Guest stars include Del tha Funkee Homosapien, Saafir, Dilated Peoples, Everlast, and Son Doobie. Track 3, Lady Venom, appeared on the soundtrack of the 2001/2002 EA Sports video game NBA Live 2002.

Track listing

Year-end charts

References

Counter Parts samples "Come Clean" by Jeru The Damaja

1999 debut albums
Swollen Members albums
Albums produced by Evidence (musician)
Albums produced by the Alchemist (musician)
Juno Award for Rap Recording of the Year recordings